Keelakoil Pathu is a village in the Papanasam taluk of Thanjavur district, Tamil Nadu, India.

Demographics 

As per the 2001 census, Keelakoil Pathu had a total population of 2596 with 1290 males and 1306 females. The sex ratio was 1012. The literacy rate was 67.72.

References 

 

Villages in Thanjavur district